Sean Newhouse is an American orchestral conductor. He graduated from the Cleveland Institute of Music. In 2007, he studied at the Tanglewood Music Center. In 2010, he was appointed assistant conductor of the Boston Symphony Orchestra. On February 24, 2011, Newhouse stepped in on two hours' notice to conduct Mahler's 9th symphony, replacing an ailing James Levine in a surprise debut.

References

External links
 

Living people
American male conductors (music)
Tanglewood Music Center alumni
Cleveland Institute of Music alumni
21st-century American conductors (music)
21st-century American male musicians
Year of birth missing (living people)